Westmoreland County, Connecticut was a county established by the State of Connecticut in October 1776, encompassing the present-day area of Wyoming Valley, in northeastern Pennsylvania. Both colonies claimed this territory and the issue was further confused by the Six Nations selling the territory to both Connecticut in 1754 and again to Pennsylvania in 1768. The first of the Yankee-Pennamite Wars were fought in and around the County, from 1771 through 1775.

In December 1782 a court of arbitration appointed by the Continental Congress met in Trenton,
New Jersey, and made a unanimous decision in favor of Pennsylvania's claim. In compensation, Connecticut received equivalent territory of 3,300,000 acres named the Western Reserve, in the future northeast of Ohio. Pennsylvania then refused to confirm the private land titles of the settlers, which caused the Second of the Yankee-Pennamite Wars. It briefly seceded to become the short-lived State of Westmoreland in 1784. Connecticut finally ceded it to Pennsylvania in 1786 after Pennsylvania confirmed the land titles and Westmoreland County was renamed to Luzerne County.

It has no relationship to the current Westmoreland County, Pennsylvania, which is located on the western and opposite side of the state.

See also
 Pennamite–Yankee War

References

Further reading
Boyd, J. P. The Susquehannah Company, 1753-1803. [CSL call number: F157 .W9 B69 1931]
Henry, William (ed.). Documents Relating to the Connecticut Settlement in the Wyoming Valley. Bowie, MD: Heritage Books, Inc., 1990 [CSL call number: F157 .W9 D63 1990 v1, 2].
Joyce, Mary Hinchcliffe. Pioneer Days in the Wyoming Valley. Philadelphia: 1928 [CSL call number: F157 .W9 J89].
Smith, William. An Examination of the Connecticut Claim to Lands in Pennsylvania: With an Appendix, Containing Extracts and Copies Taken from Original Papers. Philadelphia: Joseph Crukshank, 1774 [CSL call number: Wells Collection F157 .W9 S55].
Stark, S. Judson. The Wyoming Valley: Probate Records... Wilkes-Barre, PA: Wyoming Historical and Geological Society, 1923 [CSL call number: F157 .W9 S72].
Warfle, Richard Thomas. Connecticut's Western Colony; the Susquehannah Affair. (Connecticut Bicentennial Series, #32). Hartford, CT: American Revolutionary Bicentennial Commission of Connecticut, 1979 [CSL call number: Conn Doc Am35 cb num 32].
Wilkes-Barre, Pennsylvania. Wilkes-Barre (the "Diamond City"), Luzerne County, Pennsylvania. Wilkes-Barre, PA: The Committee on Souvenir and Program, 1906 [CSL call number: F159 .W6 W65 1906].

External links 
 Connecticut's "Susquehannah Settlers"

Former counties of Connecticut
Pre-statehood history of Connecticut
Pre-statehood history of Pennsylvania